The Lima Stock Exchange (BVL) is the stock exchange of Peru, located in the capital Lima. It has several indices. The S&P/BVL Peru General Index (formerly IGBVL) is a value-weighted index that tracks the performance of the largest and most frequently traded stocks on the Lima Exchange.

Other indices are S&P/BVL Peru Select and S&P/BVL Lima 25.

The Lima Stock Exchange is a member of the United Nations Sustainable Stock Exchanges initiative.

Sectors in the Lima Stock Exchange:

 Sector Agriculture
 Sector Banks and Finance
 Sector Diversified
 Sector Industries
 Sector Mining
 Sector Services

See also
Economy of Peru
List of stock exchanges
List of American stock exchanges

References

External links
 Bolsa de Valores de Lima

Financial services companies established in 1860
Economy of Peru
Buildings and structures in Lima
Stock exchanges in South America
Neoclassical architecture in Peru
1860 establishments in Peru
Financial services companies of Peru
Economy of Lima